Taine Plumtree (born 9 March 2000 in Wales) is a Welsh born New Zealand rugby union player who plays for the  in Super Rugby. His playing position is lock or flanker. He was named in the Blues squad for the 2021 Super Rugby Aotearoa season. He was also a member of the  2020 Mitre 10 Cup squad.

Reference list

External links
itsrugby.co.uk profile

2000 births
New Zealand rugby union players
Living people
Rugby union locks
Rugby union flankers
Wellington rugby union players
Blues (Super Rugby) players